The seventh competition weekend of the 2008–09 ISU Speed Skating World Cup was held in the Gunda Niemann-Stirnemann Halle in Erfurt, Germany, from Friday, 30 January, until Sunday, 1 February 2009.

Schedule of events
The schedule of the event is below

Medal winners

Men's events

Women's events

References

7
Isu World Cup, 2008-09, 7
Sport in Erfurt
2000s in Thuringia